EUSA or Eusa may refer to:
 Edinburgh University Students' Association 
 Eighth United States Army or U.S. Eighth Army
 European Union Studies Association
 European University Sports Association
 Eusa, a character in Russell Hoban's Riddley Walker
 Eusa, an album by Yann Tiersen
 Eusa Kills, an album by The Dead C.
 Eusa, the Breton name for the French island, Ushant